Lauri Arvid Parikka (23 September 1895 Helsinki – 29 December 1965 Helsinki) was a Finnish painter. His parents were Antti Parikka and Erika Juhontytär. Parikka studied at the Helsinki University of Art and Design (1911–1913) and at the Drawing School of the Finnish Art Association (1915). His first public showing came in 1915 in Helsinki. Parikka participated in Suomen taiteilijat exhibitions (1915–1919).

References 
 Suomen taiteiljaseura: Kuvataiteilijat 1986, toim. Mauri Faven, Erkki Hirvelä, Jorma Hautala, Reino Laitasalo, Antti Lampisuo, Pirkko Nukari, Maria-Liisa Saastamoinen ja Päivi Lampinen, ; sivu 334
 Lauri Parikka in  Kuvataiteilijamatrikkeli
 Lauri Parikka in Kansallisgalleria
 Kirjav@ - Kansallisgallerian kirjaston kokoelmatietokanta, Parikka Lauri
 Taidekoti Kirpilä, toim. Anneli Lindström; Suomen Kulttuurirahasto, 1998, 

19th-century Finnish painters
20th-century Finnish painters
1895 births
1965 deaths